Ciamis is a district, as well as a town which is known as the regency seat of Ciamis Regency in West Java, Indonesia.

Government
Since regional autonomy was implemented in 2001, Ciamis Regency has experienced regional expansion into Ciamis Regency with 30 districts and Banjar City with 4 districts. Along with the increase in the population of Ciamis Regency and to reduce the span of government control in 2006, Ciamis Regency experienced the expansion of 6 districts, rising from 30 districts to 36 districts. Likewise for the number of villages, during the period of 2007 – 2009, the number of villages increased by 3 villages. Likewise, for the same period, the number of Neighborhood Associations (RW) and Neighborhood Units (RT) experienced an increase of 27 Rukun Warga and 92 Rukun Tetangga.

The number of civil servants in Ciamis increased from 18,404 people in 2008 to 18,966 people in 2009. Based on the composition of employees by gender, during 2007 - 2009 the average number of male employees increased by 1.37 percent while female employees increased by 6.47 percent. Furthermore, the available data also shows a decline in the quality of civil servants in terms of education, namely the increasing number of employees with high school education and below, while the number of employees with higher education (diploma and above) is decreasing. This is due to the appointment of honorary employees who work in local governments with an average education level of less than high school.

The political map of Ciamis Regency as a result of the 2009 General Election (PEMILU) shows the dominance of the PDI-P in parliament (DPRD), which is followed by Democrats and Golkar. The number of DPRD members from the PDI-P was 11 people, more than a fifth of the total members of the Ciamis DPRD. The second and third highest numbers were occupied by the Democratic Party and the Golkar Party with 9 and 8 seats, respectively. To finance development, the government in Ciamis Regency in 2009 spent a budget of nearly 1.348 trillion rupiah as recorded in the realization of the Ciamis Regency APBD. This number increased by 15.91% from the APBD in 2007. Of the total APBD of Ciamis Regency of 1.348 trillion, PAD only contributed 0.051 trillion or around 3.84%, while DAU contributed around 1.05 trillion rupiah or around 63.81%. Thus, the financing of development activities in Ciamis Regency is still dependent on the DAU.

Ciamis district is divided into 12 administrative villages (of which 7 are classed as urban kelurahan and 5 as rural desa) which are as follows:

Benteng
Ciamis
Cigembor
Cisadap
Imbanagara
Imbanagara Raya
Kertasari
Linggasari
Maleber
Panyingkiran
Pawindan
Sindangrasa

Geography

Ciamis Regency, part of the province of West Java, is bordered in the north by Majalengka Regency and Kuningan Regency, in the west by Tasikmalaya Regency and Tasikmalaya City, in the east by Banjar City and Central Java Province, and in the south by the Indonesian Ocean. Based on its geographical location, Ciamis Regency is in a strategic position which is traversed by the National Road across the Province of West Java, Central Java Province and the Provincial Road through the Ciamis – Cirebon – Central Java. Its astronomical location is at 108°20' to 108°40' East Longitude and 7°40'20" to 7o41'20'' South Latitude.

The area of ​​Ciamis is 244,479 hectares or 7.73 percent of the total land area of West Java Province. In the context of the development of the West Java Province, Ciamis Regency has 2 (two) Mainstay Areas, namely the East Priangan Mainstay Area and the Pangandaran Mainstay Area. The average air temperature in Ciamis in 2009 ranged from 20.0 °C to 30.0 °C.

Places close to the coast have relatively high average air temperatures. Ciamis Regency is located on land with flat-wavy morphology to mountains, with slopes ranging from 0-40% with a distribution of 0-2% located in the middle - northeast to south and 2-40% spread in almost all sub-districts. Soil type is dominated by latosol, podsolic, alluvial and grumusol. The average rainfall in Ciamis Regency during 2009 was 3 606.50 mm while the rainfall was 177.40 days. The highest rainfall occurred in March of 2010 with 991 (mm) and the lowest occurred in August of 1967 (mm) and the day with the most rainfall occurred in April of 2014 and the lowest occurred in August of 2016. Based on the climate classification according to Schmidt-Ferguson Ciamis Regency generally has a C climate type.

Ciamis Regency is fed by the main river, the Citanduy River, which flows from Mount Cakrabuana (upstream) in Tasikmalaya Regency and empties into Sagara Anakan, Central Java Province, with its tributaries consisting of the Cimuntur River, Cijolang and Ciseel rivers. In the southern part, the Cimedang River flows with its tributaries consisting of the Cikondang River, Cibegal River, Cipaledang River, Cibungur River, Citatah River I, Citatah River II, Cigar River, Ciharuman River, Cigembor River, Cikuya River, Cijengkol River, Cimagung River and Cicondong River. Most of the Ciamis Regency area is included in the Citanduy Watershed (DAS), while the rest is included in the Cimedang Watershed.

Most of the villages in Ciamis are non-coastal villages with a total of 328 villages with the topography of the area mostly in the plains as many as 153 villages and 162 villages on the slopes, while the villages in the Watershed (DAS) are 13 villages.

Climate
Ciamis has a tropical rainforest climate (Af) with heavy to very heavy rainfall year-round.

Education

The Literacy Rate in Ciamis Regency from 2007-2009 saw an increase in the percentage of the literate population. In 2007, the literacy rate was 96.57 percent, increasing to 97.01 percent in 2009. The Average Length of Schooling for the Ciamis Regency population also increased. The average length of schooling for 2007 was 6.78 years, increasing to 7.09 years in 2009 (leaving school in the second year of middle school).

Achievements in the field of education are closely related to the availability of educational facilities. At the elementary school level in Ciamis Regency in 2009/2010 academic year, an average teacher teaches 17 elementary school students. While at the junior high school level, on average a teacher teaches 21 students and at the high school level teacher teaches 13 students. The school's capacity for elementary education in Ciamis Regency reaches 137 people, while at the junior high school level the capacity is 301 people and at the high school level of 273 people.

History

The process of the birth of the anniversary of Ciams Regency began with the decree of the Regional House of Representatives of the Ciamis Regency on October 6, 1970, concerning the formation of the committee for the preparation of history of galuh, in which the committee was accompanied by a team of historians from Ikip Bandung led by Said Raksanegara.

The formation of a committee for the preparation of the history of galuh is intended to explore and study the history of galuh as a whole, considering that there are several alternatives in determining the anniversary, whether to use it.

The result of the hard work of the galuh history writing committee and the Bandung Ikip history expert team, finally concluded that the anniversary of Ciamis Regency fell on June 12, 1642, which was later confirmed by a decree of the Regional People's Representative Council of Ciamis Regency on 17 mel 1972 number: 22/v/ kpts/dprd/1972. 

The word galuh comes from the Sanskrit language, which means gemstone, the kingdom of galuh means the kingdom of beautiful sparkling gems.

Wretikkandayun was based in Medangjati, but he founded a new government center and was named Galuh (which is located more or less in the present village of Karangkamulyan). He was crowned on the 14th suklapaksa month of caitra year 134 caka (approximately March 23, 612 AD). The date was chosen really according to tradition Tarumanagara, because it is not only done on a full day but also on that date the sun rises right at the eastern point.

The aim of Wretikkandayun to build a government center in the Karangkamulyan area (now) is to free itself from Tarumanagara, which has been a superpower for a long time. Therefore, in order to realize his obsession he had a good relationship with the Kalingga kingdom in Central Java. Even his youngest son took an oil bath in an arranged marriage with Parwati, the eldest daughter of Maharanissima.

References

 Pembrov Jawa Barat

External links 
 Ciamis Weather Forecast
 Ciamiskab – Website Pemerintah Kabupaten Ciamis

Ciamis Regency
Populated places in West Java
Regency seats of West Java